Teams will be split into groups of four, where an elimination bracket will determine the 3 teams to advance to the next stage from the sub-zones. The winner of the 2010–12 Continental Beach Volleyball Cup will advance to the Olympics.

Men

Sub-zonal phase

Pool A
Pool A was contested in Mellieha, Malta.

Malta is eliminated.

Pool B
Pool B was contested in Zreče, Slovenia.

Slovenia is eliminated.

Pool C
Pool C was contested in Las Palmas, Spain.

Iceland is eliminated.

Pool D
Pool D was contested in Montpellier, France.

Israel is eliminated.

Pool E
Pool E was contested in Illichivsk, Ukraine.

Croatia is eliminated.

Pool F
Pool F was contested in Yantarniy, Russia.

Lithuania is eliminated.

Pool G
Pool G was contested in Rhodes, Greece.

Cyprus is eliminated.

Pool H
Pool H was contested in Alanya, Turkey.

No team is eliminated, because there were only 3 teams. Finland withdrew which left a field of only 3 teams.

Zonal phase
The 24 qualified teams advanced to the Zonal phase and will be split into four groups of six teams. The top team in each group advance to the finals and the teams placing second through fifth advance to the semifinals.

Pool A
Pool A will be contested in Kazan, Russia.

 Bulgaria is eliminated, Latvia advances to the finals.

Pool B
Pool B will be contested in Tenerife, Spain.

 Slovakia is eliminated, Austria advances to the finals.

Pool C
Pool C will be contested in Copenhagen, Denmark.

 Romania is eliminated, Netherlands advances to the finals.

Pool D
Pool D will be contested in Illichivsk, Ukraine.

 No one is eliminated as Sweden is the highest ranked 6th place team, Germany advances to the finals.

Continental Cup semifinal

Semifinals will be contested in France and Switzerland.  The 16 qualified teams that advanced to the continental cup semifinal and will be split into two groups of eight teams. The top team in each group advances to the finals.

The following teams will compete.

Continental Cup final

Semifinals will be contested in Turkey.  The 8 qualified teams that advanced to the continental cup final as hosts, the four winners in the zonal phase, the two winners of the continental semifinal and the highest ranked non-qualified team. The winner will qualify to the 2012 Summer Olympics and the second and third place teams will qualify to the final qualification tournament.

The following teams will compete.

Women

Sub-zonal phase
Teams will be split into groups of four, where an elimination bracket will determine the 3 teams to advance to the zonal phase.

Pool A
Pool A will be contested in Mellieha, Malta.

 Malta is eliminated.

Pool B
Pool B will be contested in Zrece, Slovenia.

 Portugal is eliminated.

Pool C
Pool C will be contested in Las Palmas, Spain.

 Iceland is eliminated.

Pool D
Pool D will be contested in Montpellier, France.

 Liechtenstein is eliminated.

Pool E
Pool E will be contested in Illichivsk, Ukraine.

 Croatia is eliminated.

Pool F
Pool F will be contested in Yantarniy, Russia.

 Lithuania is eliminated.

Pool G
Pool G will be contested in Rhodes, Greece.

 Romania is eliminated.

Pool H
Pool H will be contested in Alanya, Turkey.

 Turkey is eliminated.

Zonal phase
The 24 qualified teams advanced to the Zonal phase and will be split into four groups of six teams. The top team in each group advance to the finals and the teams placing second through fifth advance to the semifinals.

Pool A
Pool A will be contested in Kazan, Russia.

 Cyprus withdrew, Netherlands advances to the finals.

Pool B
Pool B will be contested in Tenerife, Spain.

 No one is eliminated as Norway is the highest ranked 6th place team, Germany advances to the finals.

Pool C
Pool C will be contested in Copenhagen, Denmark.

 Denmark is eliminated, Austria advances to the finals.

Pool D
Pool D will be contested in Illichivsk, Ukraine.

 Serbia is eliminated, Switzerland advances to the finals.

Continental Cup semifinal
Semifinals will be contested in France and Switzerland. The 16 qualified teams that advanced to the continental cup semifinal and will be split into two groups of eight teams. The top team in each group advances to the finals.

The following teams will compete.

Continental Cup final
Finals will be contested in Russia. The 8 qualified teams that advanced to the continental cup final as hosts, the four winners in the zonal phase, the two winners of the continental semifinal and the highest ranked non-qualified team. The winner will qualify to the 2012 Summer Olympics and the second and third place teams will qualify to the final qualification tournament.

The following teams will compete.

 
 
 
 
 
 
 
 TBA

See also
Volleyball at the 2012 Summer Olympics

References

O
O
O
Continental Beach Volleyball Cup